Sofiane Eddy Ahmed-Kadi (born 18 April 1997) is a French football player of Algerian descent.

Club career
He started his senior club career at the Serie D club Lanusei.

On 14 July 2017, he signed a 3-year contract with the Serie B club Salernitana.

He didn't make any on-field appearances for Salernitana in the first half of the 2017–18 Serie B season, and on 26 January 2018, he joined Serie C club Alessandria on loan for the remainder of the season. He made his Serie C debut for Alessandria on 18 February 2018 in a game against Monza as an 86th-minute substitute for Pablo Andrés González. He finished the loan with 7 appearances for Alessandria, 3 of them in the starting lineup.

On 25 August 2018, he joined Serie C club Pro Piacenza on a season-long loan. The loan was terminated in January 2019, but he wasn't registered for Salernitana and didn't play for any team in the second half of the 2018–19 season.

On 10 August 2019, he joined Serie D club Foggia on loan. However, the loan deal was terminated one month later and he joined Muravera Calcio on loan for the rest of the season instead.

References

External links
 

1997 births
Footballers from Lyon
French sportspeople of Algerian descent
Living people
French footballers
Association football forwards
U.S. Salernitana 1919 players
U.S. Alessandria Calcio 1912 players
A.S. Pro Piacenza 1919 players
Calcio Foggia 1920 players
Serie C players
Serie D players
French expatriate footballers
Expatriate footballers in Italy